is a 1991 anime OVA spoofing the life and culture of otaku, individuals with obsessive interests in media, particularly anime and manga, as well as the history of Gainax, its creators. It is noted for its mix of conventional documentary film styles (with actual film, no less), with a more traditional anime storytelling fashion. It is licensed in the United States by AnimEigo. The DAICON III and IV Opening Animations from the early eighties are also featured in this OVA.

Plot
The story begins in Otaku no Video 1982, where the main character is an everyman character, Ken Kubo, living with his girlfriend Yoshiko and as a member of his college's tennis team, until introduced by his former friend Tanaka to a club of enthusiasts: a female illustrator, an information geek, a martial artist, and a weapons collector. Kubo soon joins them; and when Yoshiko abandons him, makes the wish to become the supreme enthusiast, under the name of Otaking.

Kubo's quest continues in More Otaku no Video 1985, set three years later, in which he creates his model kits, opens shops, and builds a factory in China. Later, he loses his fortune when one of his rivals (now married to Yoshiko) takes control of his enterprise; but Kubo and Tanaka, with hard-working artist Misuzu, gradually take over the anime industry with a 'magical girl' show, "Misty May". At the peak of their ambitions, Ken and Tanaka create Otakuland in 1999: the equivalent of Disneyland for otaku (the story suggests Otakuland to be located in the same city of Urayasu, Chiba Prefecture, as the original Tokyo Disneyland.)

Many years later, Ken and Tanaka return to Otakuland in a post-apocalyptic submerged Japan and find its central structure, a giant robot, converted into a functional spaceship piloted by their old friends. Miraculously rejuvenated, they fly into space in search of "The Planet of Otaku".

A Portrait of an Otaku
A controversial and humorous part of Otaku no Video was the inclusion of live-action documentary excerpts, titled "A Portrait of an Otaku". In these segments, the documentary crew would interview an anonymous otaku, typically ashamed at being a fan and whose face are censored with a mosaic and have their voices digitally masked. The mock documentary segments serve as a counterpoint to the anime: while the anime emphasizes the camaraderie, creativity, and dreams of mainstream acceptance of otaku, the mock interviews exaggerate its negative qualities. The subjects run the gamut of the otaku subculture: the interviews cover a cosplayer who now works as a computer programmer and outright denies his cosplay days, even when presented with photographic evidence, but keeps his Char Aznable helmet in his desk drawer, an airsoft otaku, a garage kit otaku, and a shut-in who video-records television programs for trade, but has not actually watched anything he's recorded. The interviews also contain fans who engage in a range of illicit or unsavory activities, such as cel thieves, a pornography fan attempting to manufacture glasses to defeat the mosaic censorship common in Japanese porn videos and who is shown masturbating during the interview, and a computer gamer—famous Gainax member Hideaki Anno—obsessed with a character in a hentai computer game (Kimiko from Gunbuster—one of Anno's works—who makes a cameo in Gainax's own hentai game, Cybernetic High School).

It is believed that all the subjects in the Portrait of an Otaku segments were Gainax employees or connected to Gainax at the time of filming. The first otaku interviewed bore a remarkable resemblance to Toshio Okada, a principal founder in Gainax, in both background and physical appearance. The gaijin otaku, Shon Hernandez, has been confirmed to have been Craig York, who with Shon Howell and Lea Hernandez, whose names were borrowed for the character, were the main staff of General Products USA, an early western branch of Gainax's merchandising enterprise in the early 1990s. The interview with "Shon Hernandez" has been a point of contention with Lea Hernandez, who, in an interview with PULP magazine, noted that the interview was unscripted and that Craig York had been fairly sincere in his thoughts and had felt that Gainax insulted their American members. In the interview, the words spoken by Shon Hernandez in the background are noticeably different from what is shown on screen via subtitle (which is based on the Japanese voice-over "translation").

At FanimeCon 2003, Hiroshi Sato, an animator and another Gainax member, mentioned that he had been in one of the interviews in Otaku no Video. In Otaku no Video, the garage kit otaku was given the pseudonym "Sato Hiroshi" for the interview.

Characters

Animated version

The main character.

Live-action version ("A Portrait of an Otaku")

A

Production and release
Since Otaku no Video was partially based in the personal life of the original creators of Gainax, who started their careers as otaku during the late seventies and the beginning of the eighties, many anime titles from that period are shown as footage or referenced in the OVA (in costumes, cosplay or other related material). Among them are Gatchaman, Uchuu Senkan Yamato, Urusei Yatsura, Captain Harlock, Mobile Suit Gundam, Dirty Pair, Space Adventure Cobra, Lupin the Third, Phoenix 2772, Silent Möbius, Magical Princess Minky Momo, The Super Dimension Fortress Macross, Macross: Do You Remember Love?, Genesis Climber Mospeada, The Wings of Honneamise, Top o Nerae! and the Daicon III and IV Opening Animations.

The first episode of Otaku no Video had its world premiere at AnimeCon ‘91 on September 1, 1991, where it was shown on 16mm with an audience of 9 people. (Fandom Unbound, Lawrence Eng, pg 90, 2012) It was later released with English subtitles on VHS in North America on March 17, 1993, on DVD on April 2, 2002, and on Blu-ray Disc on June 24, 2016, all by AnimEigo.

See also
 Comic Party
 Cosplay Complex
 DAICON III and IV Opening Animations
 Genshiken

References

External links
 Otaku no Video at Gainax 
 Otaku no Video Liner Notes by AnimEigo
 
 
 
 Discussion of the real people in the interviews in Otaku no Video by Lawrence Eng of the Cornell Japanese Animation Society
 "Buried Treasure: In Praise of Nerdiness" at Anime News Network (review)
 Anime Picks: Carl's Pick: Otaku no Video by Carl Horn at j-pop.com (review)

1991 anime OVAs
Anime with original screenplays
Gainax
Mockumentaries
Otaku in fiction